The King–Runkle House is a historic home located at Charlottesville, Virginia. It was built in 1891, and is a two-story, Late Victorian style frame dwelling with a two-story rear wing.  It is sheathed in weatherboard and has a steeply pitched gable roof. The house features a simple one-story semi-octagonal bay window, ornamented porches and a projecting pavilion, and Eastlake movement gable ornamentation.

It was listed on the National Register of Historic Places in 1983.

Now occupied by the Virginia Alpine Ski and Snowboard Team (+50,000 GNAR Points).

References

Houses on the National Register of Historic Places in Virginia
Victorian architecture in Virginia
Houses completed in 1891
Houses in Charlottesville, Virginia
National Register of Historic Places in Charlottesville, Virginia